Elevatorny is a rural locality (a settlement) in Gnilovskoye Rural Settlement, Ostrogozhsky District, Voronezh Oblast, Russia. The population was 477 as of 2010. There are three streets.

Geography 
Elevatorny is located 5 km southeast of Ostrogozhsk (the district's administrative centre) by road. 3-go otdeleniya sovkhoza Pobeda is the nearest rural locality.

References 

Rural localities in Ostrogozhsky District